Ion Cornel Coman (born 13 July 1981 in Braşov) is a Romanian football player who plays for Precizia Săcele as a striker.

He started his senior career in his home town, Braşov. After his loan to Forex Braşov from FC Brașov, the Forex administration signed him as their own player, as he became a first eleven choice for them. His Liga II performances helped his team almost reach Liga I, but, after the loss in the 2005–2006 play-off for first league promotion, the team was soon dissolved (in 2008) and Coman had to find work elsewhere.

He did eventually get to perform in Liga 1, after his promotion with Victoria Brăneşti, and his following signing with Voinţa Sibiu.

After their relegation Cornel Coman returned to his hometown with the newly founded team called Corona Braşov. Following the 2012–13 winter outgoing transfers, Coman became the captain of Corona Braşov.

Achievements 
Victoria Brăneşti
 Liga II: 2009–10
Corona Braşov
 Liga II: 2012–13

References

External links 

 
 

1981 births
Living people
Sportspeople from Brașov
Romanian footballers
Association football forwards
Liga I players
Liga II players
FC Brașov (1936) players
CS Brănești players
CSU Voința Sibiu players
CSM Corona Brașov footballers
SCM Râmnicu Vâlcea players
Sepsi OSK Sfântu Gheorghe players